Walter Hiers (July 18, 1893 – February 27, 1933) was an American silent film actor.

Biography
Born in 1893, during his two decade-long acting career spanning from 1912 to 1932, Hiers acted in 101 films. He was a particularly prolific actor who starred in over 10 films a year. He died from pneumonia in 1933, aged 39. He is interred at Forest Lawn Memorial Park in Glendale, California.

Selected filmography

Seventeen (1916) .... George Cooper
The Conquest of Canaan (1916) .... Norman Flitcroft
The Lesson (1917) .... 'Tub' Martin
Life's Whirlpool (1917) .... Fatty Holmes
Over There (1917) .... Undetermined Role
The Mysterious Miss Terry (1917) .... Freddie Bollen
God's Man (1917) .... Hugo Waldemar
The End of the Tour (1917) .... 'Skinny' Smith
Brown of Harvard (1918) .... Tubby
A Nymph of the Foothills (1918) .... Tubby
A Man's World (1918) .... Larry Hanlon
The Accidental Honeymoon (1918) .... Jimmy
Our Little Wife (1918) .... Bobo Brown
It Pays to Advertise (1919) .... Ambrose Peale
Why Smith Left Home (1919) .... Bob White
Bill Henry (1919) .... Salesman
The Fear Woman (1919) .... Percy Farwell
Leave It to Susan (1919) .... Horace Peddingham
When Doctors Disagree (1919) .... John Turner
Spotlight Sadie (1919) .... Jack Mills
Experimental Marriage (1919) .... Charlie Hamilton
Hard Boiled (1919) .... Hiram Short
Oh, Lady, Lady (1920) .... Willoughby Finch
Held by the Enemy (1920) .... Thomas Beene
A City Sparrow (1920) .... Tim Ennis
So Long Letty (1920) .... Tommy Robbins
The Fourteenth Man (1920) .... Harry Brooks
Going Some (1920) .... Berkeley Fresno
Miss Hobbs (1920) .... George Jessup
Mrs. Temple's Telegram (1920) .... Frank Fuller
The Turning Point (1920) .... Billy Inwood
Young Mrs. Winthrop (1920) .... Dick Chetwyn
What's Your Husband Doing? (1920) .... Charley Pidgeon
The Speed Girl (1921) .... Soapy Taylor
Her Sturdy Oak (1921) .... Samuel Butteers
A Kiss in Time (1921) .... Bertie Ballast
Two Weeks with Pay (1921) .... Hotel Clerk
Sham (1921) .... Montee Buck
The Snob (1921) .... Pud Welland
The Ghost Breaker (1922) .... Rusty Snow
Is Matrimony a Failure? (1922) .... Jack Hoyt
Her Gilded Cage (1922) .... Bud Walton
Bought and Paid For (1922) .... James Gilley
Sixty Cents an Hour (1923) .... Jimmy Kirk, a soda-jerker
Mr. Billings Spends His Dime (1923) .... John Percival Billings
The Triflers (1924) .... Chick Warren
Along Came Ruth (1924) .... Plinty Bangs
Christine of the Hungry Heart (1924) .... Dan Madison
The Virgin (1924) .... Sam Hawkins
Hold Your Breath (1924) .... Her Fiancé
Fair Week (1924) .... Slim Swasey
Flaming Barriers (1924) .... Henry Van Sickle
Tender Feet (1925)
A Rarin' Romeo (1925)
Good Spirits (1925)
Excuse Me (1925) .... Porter
Hold That Lion (1926) .... Dick Warren
Hitchin' Up (1926)
Fresh Faces (1926)
A Wireless Lizzie (1926)
Weak, But Willing (1926)
Night Life (1927) .... Manager
Blondes by Choice (1927) .... Horace Rush
The Girl from Gay Paree (1927) .... Sam
A Racing Romeo (1927) .... Sparks
Naughty (1927)
Beware of Widows (1927) .... William Bradford
The Wrong Mr. Wright (1927) .... Bond
Husband Hunters (1927) .... Sylvester Jones
The First Night (1927) .... Mr. Cleveland
Speedy (1928) (uncredited) .... The Cook
A Simple Sap (1928) .... He
A Woman Against the World (1928) .... Reporter
A Private Scandal (1932)

References

External links

 
 Walter Hiers at Virtual History

1893 births
1933 deaths
Male actors from Georgia (U.S. state)
American male silent film actors
People from Cordele, Georgia
Deaths from pneumonia in California
20th-century American male actors
Burials at Forest Lawn Memorial Park (Glendale)